Afrothismia is a genus of plant in family Burmanniaceae, first described as a genus in 1906. It is native to tropical Africa.

The genus name of Afrothismia is in honour of Thomas Smith (x - 1825), who was an English expert at microscopy.

Species
As accepted by Kew;

References

Dioscoreales genera
Burmanniaceae
Flora of Africa
Parasitic plants
Taxonomy articles created by Polbot